Ancylodactylus barbouri, also known commonly as Barbour's gecko, is a species of lizard in the family Gekkonidae. The species is endemic to Tanzania.

Etymology
The specific name, barbouri, is in honor of American herpetologist Thomas Barbour.

Geographic range
A. barbouri is found in the Uluguru Mountains of Tanzania.

Reproduction
A. barbouri is oviparous.

References

Further reading
Perret J-L (1986). "Révision des espèces africaines de genre Cnemaspis Strauch, sous-genre Ancylodactylus Müller (Lacertilia, Gekkonidae), avec la description de quatre espèces nouvelles [= Revision of the African species of the genus Cnemaspis Strauch, subgenus Ancylodactylus Müller (Lacertilia, Gekkonidae), with the description of four new species]". Revue Suisse de Zoologie 93 (2): 457–505. (Cnemaspis barbouri, new species, pp. 497–498, Figure 33). (in French, with an abstract in English).
Spawls S, Howell K, Hinkel H, Menegon M (2018). Field Guide to East African Reptiles, Second Edition. London: Bloomsbury Natural History. 624 pp. . (Cnemaspis barbouri, p. 78).

Ancylodactylus
Reptiles described in 1986